Yesun Temur (Есөнтөмөр) was a Tengric khan (r. 1337–1339) of Chagatai Khanate. He was the younger brother of Changshi Khan. His name literally means "Nine Iron" in the Mongolian language.

In order to take power, Yesun Temur is said to have poisoned (murdered) his brother. He regretted his action and blamed his mother for Changshi's death. His guilt caused him to become very stressed, which led to excessive drinking. He was overthrown by 'Ali-Sultan of the House of Ogedei in 1339.

See also
 Yesün Temür (Yuan dynasty)

References

External links
Ц.Энхчимэг - "Монголын цагаадайн улс" 2006 он
W. Barthold - Turkestan Down to the Mongol Invasion

Chagatai khans
14th-century monarchs in Asia